Lundar is an unincorporated community recognized as a local urban district situated in Manitoba, Canada. It is located in the Rural Municipality of Coldwell, in Manitoba's Interlake Region, 99 km north of Winnipeg on Hwy 6. Nearby attractions are Lake Manitoba and its beaches, and the Lundar Provincial Park. Lundar is home to a Canada goose refuge, and a large statue of a Canada goose is located in the community. Lundar was founded by Icelandic settlers.

Toponymy
Lundar is the nominative plural indefinite of lundur "wood, grove" in Icelandic, from Old Norse lundr, same thing. This place-name is related through Old Norman to the Canadian Patronymic Lalonde, which is from the Norman surnames Lalonde or Delalonde, themselves from place-names in Normandy called la Londe "the grove, the wood" (Lunda in ancient documents).

Climate
Lundar experiences a humid continental climate (Köppen Dfb) with warm to hot summers and cold winters.  There are two weather stations in the Lundar area reporting climate data:

Demographics 

References

Designated places in Manitoba
Local urban districts in Manitoba
Places in Canada settled by Icelanders